Albert Falls Dam is a dam in the Umgeni River, just outside Pietermaritzburg, KwaZulu-Natal, South Africa. It was established in 1976.

A lake-wide bloom of the dinoflagellate Ceratium hirundinella, discovered in Albert Falls Dam in October 2006, exposed a significant ecological change indicative of reduced water quality in this historically mesotrophic reservoir. The spatial distribution of the bloom was examined synoptically in October 2006 and in January 2007.

See also
List of reservoirs and dams in South Africa
List of rivers in South Africa

References 

 List of South African Dams from the Department of Water Affairs

This dam is used for fishing, swimming, boating, waterskiing, kneeboarding, sailing, and other water activities. The water is brown and murky.

Dams in South Africa
Dams completed in 1976